Kim Ryun-seong (born 4 June 2002) is a South Korean footballer who plays as a defender for Gimcheon Sangmu.

Career statistics

Club

References

External links

Kim Ryun-seong at the Pohang Steelers F.C. website

2002 births
Living people
South Korean footballers
South Korea under-17 international footballers
Association football defenders
Pohang Steelers players
Gimcheon Sangmu FC players
K League 1 players